Texas Gas Transmission is a natural gas pipeline which brings gas from the Louisiana Gulf coast up through Arkansas, Mississippi, Tennessee, and Kentucky, to supply gas to Illinois, Indiana, and Ohio.  It is owned by Boardwalk Pipelines.  Its FERC code is 18.

Texas Gas was created in 1948 with the merger of Memphis Natural Gas Company and Kentucky Natural Gas Corporation.  Since that time, Texas Gas has changed ownership four times.  The company was bought by CSX Corporation in 1983; by Transco Energy Corp. in 1989; by Williams in 1995; and by Loews Corporation in 2003.

References

External links

Pipeline Electronic Bulletin Board

Natural gas pipelines in the United States
Non-renewable resource companies established in 1948
1948 establishments in the United States
Natural gas pipelines in Texas
Natural gas pipelines in Arkansas
Natural gas pipelines in Mississippi
Natural gas pipelines in Illinois
Natural gas pipelines in Tennessee
Natural gas pipelines in Kentucky
Natural gas pipelines in Indiana
Natural gas pipelines in Ohio